Thomas Adamandopoulos (born September 22, 1986) is a Greek-Italian-French Muay Thai kickboxer who currently trains in Marseille, France.  He a former ISKA world champion 135 lbs.

Biography and career
Adamandopoulos trains in Marseille with his trainer Hervé Busonera. He fought Cyril Abbas at TK2 World MAX 2012 in Marseille, France, on October 6, 2012 and won by a decisive .

He rematched Karim Bennoui at Nuit des Champions in Marseille on November 24, 2012 in a fight for the WKN World Oriental Rules title (-62.100 kg) and lost by decision.

Adamandopoulos was scheduled to fight Alexander Arutyunyan at Supremacy II: Triumph in Stockholm, Sweden on February 23, 2013.

He attempted to make the first defence of his Krush title against Hideaki Yamazaki at Krush.27 in Tokyo, Japan on March 20, 2013 but was dropped with a spinning back fist in round two and lost by unanimous decision.

Adamandopoulos was knocked out by Modibo Diarra at La Nuit De Gladiateur in Marseille on June 28, 2013.

He beat Xavier Bastard on points in La 20ème Nuit des Champions -62 kg/136 lb tournament reserve match in Marseille, France on November 23, 2013.

Also, he is very known in France due to his participation to "Les Anges" on NRJ12.

Titles and accomplishments

2012 KRUSH Super Lightweight Champion (-63.500 kg)
2011 I.S.K.A. World Kickboxing Champion (-62.300 kg)
2011 FIKB World Chauss'Fight Champion (-63.500 kg)
2011 FFSCDA French Cup K-1 Rules Champion (-63.500 kg)
2008 WAKO Pro European Kickboxing Champion (-63.500 kg)
2008 French Kickboxing Champion
2008 French Full Contact Champion
2007 K-1 Rules Tournament Champion in Loano, Italy
2007 European Amateur Full Contact Champion

Muay Thai record

|-
|-  bgcolor="#FFBBBB"
| 2018-10-27|| Loss ||align=left| Geoffrey Mocci || TK2 World Max 2018 || Marseille, France, || Decision (unanimous) || 3 || 3:00
|-
|-  bgcolor="#CCFFCC"
| 2016-10-08 || Win ||align=left| Gabriel Moreno || TK2 World Max 2016 || Marseille, France, || Decision (unanimous) || 3 || 3:00
|-
|-  bgcolor="#FFBBBB"
| 2015-06-05 || Loss ||align=left| Shane Oblonsky || Glory 22: Lille || Lille, France, || Decision (unanimous) || 3 || 3:00
|-
|-  bgcolor="#FFBBBB"
| 2014-11-22 || Loss ||align=left| Javier Hernandez (kickboxer)  || La 21ème Nuit des Champions  || Marseille, France || TKO  || 5 ||  3:00
|-
|-  bgcolor="#FFBBBB"
| 2014-06-12|| Loss ||align=left| Minoru Kimura || Krush 42 || Japan ||TKO (3 Knockdowns/Right Uppercuts) || 2 || 2:55
|-
|-  bgcolor="#CCFFCC"
| 2013-11-23 || Win ||align=left| Xavier Bastard || La 20ème Nuit des Champions, Reserve Match || Marseille, France || Decision || 3 || 3:00
|-
|-  bgcolor="#FFBBBB"
| 2013-06-28 || Loss ||align=left| Modibo Diarra || La Nuit De Gladiateur || Marseille, France || KO || || 
|-
|-  bgcolor="#FFBBBB"
| 2013-03-20 || Loss ||align=left| Hideaki Yamazaki || Krush.27 || Tokyo, Japan || Decision (unanimous) || 3 || 3:00
|-
! style=background:white colspan=9 |
|-
|-  bgcolor="#FFBBBB"
| 2012-11-24 || Loss ||align=left| Karim Bennoui || Nuit des Champions || Marseille, France || Decision || 5 || 3:00
|-
! style=background:white colspan=9 |
|-
|-  bgcolor="#CCFFCC"
| 2012-10-06 || Win ||align=left| Cyril Abbas || TK2 World Max 2012 || Marseille, France || Decision || 3 || 3:00
|-
|-  bgcolor="#CCFFCC"
| 2012-08-12 || Win ||align=left| Ryuji Kajiwara || Krush.21 || Tokyo, Japan || KO (Highkick) || 2 || 1:42
|-
! style=background:white colspan=9 |
|-
|-  bgcolor="#FFBBBB"
| 2012-05-19 || Loss ||align=left| Yetkin Özkul || Urban Boxing United || Marseille, France || TKO (Referee Stoppage) || 4 || 
|-
! style=background:white colspan=9 |
|-
|-  bgcolor="#FFBBBB"
| 2011-11-12 || Loss ||align=left| Karim Bennoui || La 18ème Nuit des Champions || Marseille, France || Decision (2-1) || 5 || 3:00
|-
! style=background:white colspan=9 |
|-
|-  bgcolor="#CCFFCC"
| 2011-08-14 || Win ||align=left| Keiji Ozaki || Krush.11 || Tokyo, Japan || Decision (Unanimous) || 5 || 3:00
|-
! style=background:white colspan=9 |
|-
|-  bgcolor="#fbb"
| 2011-06-17 || Loss ||align=left| Modibo Diarra || La 2ème Nuit des Gladiateurs || Marseille, France || KO (High Kick) || 3 ||
|-
|-  bgcolor="#CCFFCC"
| 2011-05-27 || Win ||align=left| Aitor Eguzkiza || K-1 Rules Kick Tournament 2011 in Marseille || Marseille, France || Decision || 5 || 2:00
|-
|-  bgcolor="#CCFFCC"
| 2011-05-07 || Win ||align=left| Amar Lounas || Urban Boxing United 2 || Marseille, France || Decision || 3 || 3:00
|-
|-  bgcolor="#CCFFCC"
| 2011-03-19 || Win ||align=left| Hirachidine Saindou || Le 8ème Trophée de l'Ephèbe || Agde, France || TKO (Referee Stoppage) || 4 || 
|-
|-  bgcolor="#CCFFCC"
| 2011-02-26 || Win ||align=left| Lionel Diderot || Coupe de France FFSCDA K-1 Rules || Arles, France || TKO || 2 || 
|-
! style=background:white colspan=9 |
|-
|-  bgcolor="#CCFFCC"
| 2010-11-26 || Win ||align=left| Cédrick Peynaud || La Nuit des Champions 2010 || Marseille, France || KO (Right Highkick) || 1 || 2:16
|-
|-  bgcolor="#CCFFCC"
| 2010-06-18 || Win ||align=left| Roberto Straffalaci || La Nuit des Gladiateurs || Marseille, France || KO || 4 || 
|-
|-  bgcolor="#FFBBBB"
| 2010-06-04 || Loss ||align=left| Olivier Tchétché || Muaythaitv Trophy 2010 - Etape 3 || Paris, France || Decision || 3 || 3:00
|-
|-  bgcolor="#FFBBBB"
| 2010-04-24 || Loss ||align=left| Boubacar Konta || Fight Zone IV || Villeurbanne, France || Decision (Unanimous) || 3 || 3:00
|-
|-  bgcolor="#CCFFCC"
| 2010-02-13 || Win ||align=left| Tristan Benard || Stars Night 2010 || Vitrolles, France || Decision || 5 || 3:00
|-
|-  bgcolor="#CCFFCC"
| 2010-01-08 || Win ||align=left| Mamadou Diabira || Muaythaitv Trophy 2010 - Etape 2 || Marseille, France || Decision || 3 || 3:00
|-
|-  bgcolor="#FFBBBB"
| 2009-11-21 || Loss ||align=left| Herbert Womaleu || Muaythaitv Trophy 2010 - Etape 1 || Saint-Estève, France || TKO (Referee Stoppage) || 4 || 
|-
|-  bgcolor="#FFBBBB"
| 2009-11-14 || Loss ||align=left| Damien Alamos || La Nuit des Champions 2009 || Marseille, France || Decision || 5 || 3:00
|-
! style=background:white colspan=9 |
|-
|-  bgcolor="#CCFFCC"
| 2009-10-09 || Win ||align=left| Jonathan Lidon || TK2 World MAX 2009 || Aix-en-Provence, France || Decision || 3 || 3:00
|-
|-  bgcolor="#CCFFCC"
| 2009-06-27 || Win ||align=left| Madjid Teggia || All Stars Kickboxing 2009 || Gémenos, France || KO (Highkick) || 2 || 
|-
|-  bgcolor="#FFBBBB"
| 2009-06-13 || Loss ||align=left| Alessandro Alias || The Night of Superfight || Italy || Ext R. Decision || 4 || 3:00
|-
! style=background:white colspan=9 |
|-
|-  bgcolor="#CCFFCC"
| 2009-04-18 || Win ||align=left| Boubacar Konta || Fight Zone III || Villeurbanne, France || Decision (Unanimous) || 5 || 2:00
|-
|-  bgcolor="#CCFFCC"
| 2009-02-06 || Win ||align=left| Jonathan Iniacio || K-1 Rules Kick Tournament 2009 in Marseille || Marseille, France || TKO || 2 || 
|-
|-  bgcolor="#CCFFCC"
| 2008-12-19 || Win ||align=left| Yetkin Özkul || Kickboxing Championnat D'Europe || Marseille, France || Decision (Unanimous) || 3 || 3:00 
|-
|-  bgcolor="#CCFFCC"
| 2008-11-29 || Win ||align=left| Amar Lamèche || La Nuit des Champions 2008 || Marseille, France || Decision || 3 || 3:00
|-
|-  bgcolor="#CCFFCC"
| 2008-09-27 || Win ||align=left| Jérémy Caillol || F-1 World Max 2008 || Meyreuil, France || Decision || 5 || 3:00
|-
|-  bgcolor="#c5d2ea"
| 2008-06-07 || Draw ||align=left| Amar Lounas || La Nuit des Challenges 5 || Lyon, Saint-Fons, France || Decision Draw || 5 || 3:00
|-
|-  bgcolor="#CCFFCC"
| 2008-03-07 || Win ||align=left| Florent Martins || All Stars Kickboxing 2008 || Marseille, France || KO (Right Highkick) || 4 || 
|-
! style=background:white colspan=9 |
|-
|-  bgcolor="#FFBBBB"
| 2008-01-02 || Loss ||align=left| Yohan Havan || K-1 Rules Kick Tournament 2008 in Marseille || Marseille, France || Decision || 5 || 2:00
|-
|-  bgcolor="#CCFFCC"
| 2007-12-08 || Win ||align=left| Abdul Habbou || Quarto Memorial Mimmo Polizzano, Final || Loano, Italy || Ext R. Decision || 4 || 2:00
|-
! style=background:white colspan=9 |
|-
|-  bgcolor="#CCFFCC"
| 2007-12-08 || Win ||align=left| Alessio Cassara || Quarto Memorial Mimmo Polizzano, Semi Final || Loano, Italy ||  ||  || 
|-
|-  bgcolor="#CCFFCC"
| 2007-12-08 || Win ||align=left| || Quarto Memorial Mimmo Polizzano, Quarter Final || Loano, Italy ||  ||  || 
|-
|-  bgcolor="#CCFFCC"
| 2007-11-17 || Win ||align=left| Lucien Gross || La Nuit des Champions 2007 || Marseille, France || Decision || 3 || 3:00
|-
|-  bgcolor="#CCFFCC"
| 2007-00-00 || Win ||align=left| Khader Becharef || European Amateur Full-Contact Championship || France || Decision || 5 || 2:00
|-
! style=background:white colspan=9 |
|-
|-
| colspan=9 | Legend:

See also 
List of male kickboxers

References

Living people
French male kickboxers
French Muay Thai practitioners
French people of Greek descent
1986 births